Francis Banks (February 1865 – after 1890) was an English professional footballer who played in the Football Alliance for Small Heath. Banks was born in Aston, now part of Birmingham, and joined Small Heath as a backup to goalkeeper Chris Charsley in 1889. In his first competitive game he conceded nine goals away at Sheffield Wednesday, and in his remaining three games, at the end of the 1889–90 season, he let in a total of nineteen. He then joined Warwick County of the Midland League.

References

1865 births
Year of death missing
Footballers from Birmingham, West Midlands
English footballers
Association football goalkeepers
Birmingham City F.C. players
Warwick County F.C. players
Football Alliance players
Date of birth missing